Peter John Hartley (born 18 April 1960) is an English first-class cricketer and umpire.

Playing career
Born 18 April 1960, in Keighley West Riding of Yorkshire, Hartley made his debut for Warwickshire in 1982. He moved to Yorkshire in 1985, and stayed there until 1997, when he relocated to Hampshire. When he retired at the end of the 2000 season, Hartley was Hampshire's opening bowler.

He made his highest first-class score for Yorkshire in a Roses match in 1988, making 127 not out out of a total of 224, while batting at no.8 and coming to the wicket with his team 37 for 6. Another highlight of his playing career was playing in the final when Yorkshire won the 1987 Benson & Hedges Cup, a rare triumph for the county in these years.

Hartley represented the England team in a Masters tournament in Sharjah in 1996.

Umpiring career
After retiring as a player, Hartley became an umpire, making his debut as a first-class umpire in 2003. Between 2006 and 2009 he officiated in international cricket, taking charge of six one day international matches and three Twenty20 international matches.

As of 2021, he remains a member of the England and Wales Cricket Board's umpire list.

See also
 List of One Day International cricket umpires
 List of Twenty20 International cricket umpires

References

1960 births
Living people
Hampshire cricketers
Warwickshire cricketers
Yorkshire cricketers
English cricketers
English cricket umpires
English One Day International cricket umpires
English Twenty20 International cricket umpires
Cricketers from Keighley
English cricketers of 1969 to 2000